The Lampads  or Lampades  are the nymphs of the Underworld in Greek mythology.

Mythology
Companions of Hecate, the Greek goddess of witchcraft and crossroads, they were a gift from Zeus for Hecate's loyalty in the Titanomachy. They bear torches and accompany Hecate on her night-time travels and hauntings. Some accounts tell of how the light of the Lampads' torches has the power to drive one to madness. They also serve as handmaidens to other Underworld goddesses, such as Persephone/Proserpina. They had parties called Mysteries, and they loved to play tricks on people. Some even say that they led travelers to their death. Others say that they helped people.

The Lampads were probably the daughters of various Underworld gods, Daimones, river gods, including Nyx.

See also
 Persephone/Proserpina
 Melinoe
 Macaria
 Angelos
 Minthe
 Orphne/Gorgyra
 Acheron
 Ascalaphus
 Leuce/Leuka, the White Poplar
 Styx
 Shikome hags of the Underworld, in Shinto-Buddhist mythology.
 Yakshini

References

External links
 Lampades at Theoi

Greek legendary creatures
Nymphs
Witchcraft in folklore and mythology